Castellaniella caeni is a Gram-negative, oxidase-positive, catalase-negative, facultatively anaerobic, denitrifying, nonmotile bacterium from the genus Castellaniella, isolated from the sludge of the aerobic treatment tanks of a municipal leachate treatment plant in Daejeon in the Republic of Korea.

References

External links
Type strain of Castellaniella caeni at BacDive -  the Bacterial Diversity Metadatabase

Burkholderiales
Bacteria described in 2008